The Monteagle Sunday School Assembly (MSSA) is an interdenominational religious organization based in Monteagle, Tennessee. It was chartered by the state of Tennessee on October 31, 1882, with the purpose of
the advancement of science, literary attainment, Sunday School interests, and the promotion of the broadest popular culture in the interest of Christianity without regard to sect or denomination. 
The MSSA was one of hundreds of similar Assemblies patterned after the Chautauqua Institution in New York in the late 19th century, of which only nine or ten remain active. In 1982, Monteagle Sunday School Assembly celebrated its 100th year of continuous operation and its grounds were placed on the National Register of Historic Places as a historic district.

The MSSA conducts a variety of spiritual, educational, cultural, and health development activities for all ages during an eight-week season each summer and through retreats and other activities throughout the year. Assembly members represent 23 different states and the District of Columbia. Many belong to fifth-generation families who return each summer to pursue spiritual and intellectual enlightenment, to strengthen family ties, and to engage in Christian fellowship and mission.

History
The MSSA was founded in 1882 by the Sunday School Convention of Tennessee, which sought to establish a "Sunday School Congress" in Tennessee. At the time, a number of states had these congresses, often called Assemblies, all of them modelled after the Chautauqua Institution in New York, which is regarded as the first of these Assemblies. They were meant not only as a place for religious activities, such as retreats, but also as places for higher learning at a time when there were few colleges and institutes available to people. The goal of the Assembly was to "combine Sunday School training with a broader program of educational and cultural pursuits". Monteagle Sunday School Assembly was founded as a Chautauqua for the members to grow spiritually and intellectually .

The MSSA opened for its first summer session on July 17, 1883. Although the Assembly began small with only an amphitheater and dining hall, the summer courses offered on the grounds attracted many students and teachers, as most southern schools didn't offer summer programs. The thousands of yearly visitors soon encouraged the Assembly to begin building projects which led to the creation of many cottages, public meeting halls and boarding rooms. In the 20th century, the MSSA, as well as a number of the other Assemblies modeled after Chautauqua, formed the International Chautauqua Alliance. This coalition brought the Assembly even greater popularity, and allowed it to begin showing guest ministers, lectures and entertainers from around the country during the summer season.

The World Wars and Great Depression severely hindered the revenues and popularity of the MSSA, forcing it to close many cottages and discontinue nearly half their programs; many other Assemblies were forced to shut down during this period. It was nearly 30 years before interest returned to the MSSA, leading to the restoration and refurbishing of many cottages, as well as the introduction of new programs and guest speakers. This reawakening of interest peaked in the 1980s, when the MSSA held its Centennial Celebration and was added to the National Register of Historic Places. The MSSA is one of only 9 surviving Assemblies in the United States, and still receives thousands of visitors a year.

Grounds
The Assembly grounds, which comprise the Monteagle Sunday School Assembly Historic District, constitute a large part of the area of the town of Monteagle. A stone gatehouse marks the entry to the grounds, which are served by narrow, winding roads. Most of the 162 buildings on the grounds are residences for Assembly participants, typically one- and two-story frame cottages with porches, featuring Queen Anne and Carpenter Gothic design elements. A chapel, library, dining hall, and several recreational structures are also provided. About 40 percent of the grounds are maintained as parkland.

Summer programs
The 8-week period from early June to August, referred to as the Season, is when the MSSA hosts its annual summer program. This includes a number of social, spiritual and cultural activities for all ages, as well as guest speakers, entertainers and ministers.

Religious activities
Often known as the cornerstone of the Assembly program, the number of spiritual activities appeal to Christians of all denominations, and community activities and prayer also help visitors and members get to know each other. The MSSA offers Sunday school and Sunday church, evening prayer [called Twilight Prayers], and a weekly guest minister and speaker, all of which take place in the Assembly's small but well-known church, Warren Chapel, designed along with the Harton (dining) Hall also on the mall, by renowned Nashville architect, Edwin A Keeble who was born in the Assembly in 1905 and died in Sewanee in 1979.

Cultural activities
The Assembly also offers culturally and socially enriching activities during the summer, which can include cottage tours, bazaars, flea markets and guest lecturers, as well as card parties and book clubs offered by the Monteagle Woman's Association.

Youth activities
By far, the widest range of activities are offered to 5-18 year-olds who come to the Assembly. There is no shortage of things for children and teens to do, and on any given day the Assembly could host evening movies, hiking excursions, youth groups, arts and crafts, and fu.

Guests and members
Although the MSSA offers popular summer programs, it has many year-round residents who live in the cottages on the grounds. MSSA, located six miles from Sewanee, The University of the South, has been a haven for many writers and artists, including Andrew Lytle and John Gaddis. Only members of MSSA may purchase homes and mortgages are not allowed. Many other people rent out their cottages to people during the summer, and some only stay for a few days at a nearby bed and breakfast.

References

External links
Monteagle Sunday School Assembly website
The Chautauqua Institution
New Piasa Chautauqua, Chautauqua, IL

Properties of religious function on the National Register of Historic Places in Tennessee
Victorian architecture in Tennessee
Religious organizations established in 1882
21st-century Chautauquas
Chautauqua
Monteagle, Tennessee
Buildings and structures in Grundy County, Tennessee
Religious buildings and structures in Tennessee
Christianity in Tennessee
Sunday schools
Historic districts on the National Register of Historic Places in Tennessee
National Register of Historic Places in Grundy County, Tennessee